Bajram Rexhepi (3 June 1954 – 21 August 2017), was a Kosovar politician who served as the first elected post-war prime minister and later as interior minister of Kosovo and as a member of the Kosovo Assembly. He was a member of the second largest political party in Kosovo, the Democratic Party of Kosovo (PDK).

Early life and education
Rexhepi was born in Mitrovica, Kosovo on 3 June 1954. He graduated from the University of Prishtina and completed his postgraduate studies at the University of Zagreb in 1985.

Early career
Rexhepi spent most of his career working as a surgeon and achieved fame as the best surgeon for circumcisions in the Mitrovica region. During the 1999 Kosovo War, Rexhepi joined the Kosovo Liberation Army (KLA) and spent three months serving as a field doctor.  He served as mayor of the Albanian section of Mitrovica, working with United Nations and NATO peacekeepers to implement ideas to diminish the civil unrest.

As Serbs and Albanians had broken off all dialogue, Rexhepi offered to give up his position in favour of a UN administrator, but Serbs rejected this proposal.

Prime Minister

In the general elections of November 2001 in Kosovo, Rexhepi's party won 25.7 percent of the votes, second only to Ibrahim Rugova's Democratic League of Kosovo (LDK), and Rexhepi was appointed prime minister by the Assembly of Kosovo on 4 March 2002.

Bajram Rexhepi was a compromise candidate to lead the broad-coalition government with the support of all parties represented in parliament. LDK declined to support Rexhepi's party leader, Hashim Thaçi, as a potential prime minister; other parties declined to enter into a smaller coalition with LDK. Ultimately, parties reached a political agreement whereby Rugova was elected president and Rexhepi appointed the first post-war prime minister.

With key powers reserved for the UN administration, Rexhepi's cabinet included nine ministers as follows:

 Ali Sadria (LDK), Economy and Finance
 Ali Jakupi (PDK), Trade and Industry
 Rexhep Osmani (LDK), Education, Science and Technology
 Behxhet Brajshori (LDK), Culture, Youth, Sports and Non-Resident Affairs
 Zef Morina (PShDK), Transport and Communications
 Ahmet Jusufi (AAK), Labor and Social Welfare
 Et'hem Çeku (AAK), Spatial Planning
 Jakup Krasniqi (PDK), Public Services
 Numan Balić (SDA), Health

In the following general elections, held on 24 October 2004, the Democratic Party of Kosovo came second and won 30 seats in the parliament.

Minister of Interior
On 1 April 2010, Rexhepi was appointed Minister of Internal Affairs of the Republic of Kosovo, replacing Zenun Pajaziti. On 22 February 2011 the Assembly confirmed Rexhepi in his post within the new Cabinet led by Prime Minister Hashim Thaçi

Post-politics, illness, and death
Rexhepi left politics in 2014 to resume his career as a surgeon. In April 2017, Rexhepi suffered multiple strokes, which left him in a coma. After several days of treatment in Kosovo, Rexhepi was sent for further treatment in Turkey. On 21 August 2017, Rexhepi died at a hospital in Istanbul at the age of 63.

Notes

References

External links 

1954 births
2017 deaths
Politicians from Mitrovica, Kosovo
Prime ministers of Kosovo
Kosovo Albanians
Democratic Party of Kosovo politicians
Interior ministers of Kosovo
Kosovan Muslims
Kosovan surgeons
Yugoslav surgeons